Brevundimonas lenta is a Gram-negative and rod-shaped bacterium from the genus of Brevundimonas which has been isolated from soil from Dokdo in Korea.

References

Bacteria described in 2007
Caulobacterales